Margaret Barry (1917–1989) was an Irish Traveller, traditional singer and banjo player.

Biography
Born Margaret Cleary in Cork into a family of Travellers and street singers, she taught herself how to play the zither banjo and the fiddle at a young age. At the age of sixteen, after a family disagreement, Margaret left home and started performing as a street musician. 

In the early 1950s, she moved to London, originally to appear on a TV series called The Songhunter, produced by a young David Attenborough. Attenborough described in recent years how Barry’s striking wild, toothless appearance and her out-of-tune banjo playing prompted a volley of angry complaints about Irish tinkers being allowed on the TV. Barry became a well-known name on the London folk scene in the 1950s where, with her distinctive singing style and idiosyncratic banjo accompaniment, she was frequently accompanied by the fiddler Michael Gorman. Her singing and banjo playing became a major influence on the younger generation of ballad singers in Ireland and the UK, including Luke Kelly. She performed in the Carnegie Hall and the Rockefeller Centre in New York.

One song for which Barry is particularly noted is "She Moved Through the Fair". Asked by an interviewer, Karl Dallas, whether she had learned it from her family or from other Travellers, she replied cheerfully, "Oh, no. I got it off a gramophone record by Count John McCormack". The accompanying book to the Topic Records 70 year anniversary boxed set, Three Score and Ten, lists Her Mantle So Green as one of the classic albums and "The Factory Girl" from Street Songs and Fiddle Tunes of Ireland with Michael Gorman is track 9 on the third CD in the set.

A play, She Moved Through the Fair: The legend of Margaret Barry, co-written by Mary McPartlan and Colin Irwin had its debut in 2017 at the Tron Theatre in Glasgow, as part of the Celtic Connections Festival. Poet/songwriter, Frank Callery wrote a song for the centenary of Barry's birth. Singer/songwriter, Tim O'Riordan, wrote a song in celebration of Barry, "The Heart of the Song (for Margaret Barry)" and recorded it on the album Taibhse in 2018.

At the RTÉ Radio 1 Folk Awards in 2019, Barry was inducted into the Hall of Fame by American singer Peggy Seeger.

Discography

 Songs of an Irish Tinker Lady (Riverside RLP 12–602, 1956)
 Street Songs and Fiddle Tunes (Topic 10T6, 1957) – with Michael Gorman
 Ireland’s Queen Of The Tinkers Sings (Top Rank 25/020, 1960)
 The Blarney Stone (Prestige Irish, 1961) – with Michael Gorman
 Songs From the Hills of Donegal (Washington WV 731, 1962)
 Irish Music In London Pubs (Folkways FG 3575, 1965) – with Michael Gorman
 Her Mantle So Green (Topic 12T123, 1965) – with Michael Gorman
 Come Back Paddy Reilly (Emerald GEM 1003, 1968)
 Sing and Play (Folkways FW8729, 1975)
 Ireland's Own (Outlet SOLP 1029, 1976)
 I Sang Through The Fairs (Rounder 11661-1774-2, 1998)
 Travellin' People from Ireland (Emerald EMCD8004, 2001) – with Pecker Dunne
 Queen of the Gypsies (Emerald EMCD8004, 2007)
 The Definitive Collection (Songs of The Travelling People) (PMI, 2013)

See also
 Nance the Piper

Notes

References
Pohle, Horst (1987) The Folk Record Source Book; 2nd ed. p. 22 (for discography)

External links
Listen to Margaret Barry on Last FM
Biography of Margaret Barry
http://margaretbarry.blogspot.co.uk/

1917 births
1989 deaths
20th-century Irish people
Irish Travellers
Irish banjoists
Irish folk singers
Musicians from County Cork
Date of birth missing
Date of death missing
Women banjoists
Topic Records artists
Folkways Records artists
Riverside Records artists